Boron or Borón is a surname. Notable people with the surname include:

 Atilio Borón (born 1943), Argentinean sociologist
 Kathrin Boron (born 1969), German rower
 Robert de Boron, French medieval poet
 Walter Boron (born 1949), American scientist